WHIZ-FM (92.7 FM) is a commercial radio station licensed to South Zanesville, Ohio, featuring a contemporary hit radio format known as "Z92". Owned by Marquee Broadcasting, WHIZ-FM's studios are located on Downard Road in Zanesville and its transmitter is located in Crooksville, Ohio.

History
The 92.7 facility signed on January 5, 1983. It originally operated as WCVZ, a religious station owned by Christian Voice of Central Ohio.

WHIZ-FM was previously broadcast on 102.5 FM. On October 17, 2008, the Southeastern Ohio Broadcasting System, doing business as the WHIZ Media Group, announced the purchase of WCVZ, allowing 102.5 FM to move out of the Zanesville area. Under a local marketing agreement, WCVZ then simulcast WHIZ-FM's adult contemporary music format in preparation for this move until December 7, 2008, when WCVZ assumed WHIZ-FM's identity as "Z92", and WHIZ-FM became "Highway 102", featuring an automated country music format.

When 102.5 FM moved to its new location serving Baltimore, Ohio, it took the WCVZ call sign from 92.7, allowing 92.7 to use the WHIZ-FM call sign.

Former owner Christian Voice of Central Ohio continues to serve the Zanesville area on newly acquired WZNP (89.3 FM) licensed to Newark, Ohio, a part of the company's "Promise Network".  The WCVZ calls remained with WHIZ Media Group, and were used on 102.5 FM until December 23, 2010, when local marketing agreement operator Fun With Radio, LLC's WWCD calls were moved to the frequency.

On October 2, 2014, WHIZ-FM transitioned from a hot adult contemporary format to contemporary hit radio. The Littick family announced the sale of the WHIZ Media Group, including WHIZ-FM, to Marquee Broadcasting on April 20, 2022; the deal was completed on July 14, 2022.

References

External links

HIZ-FM
Radio stations established in 1983
1983 establishments in Ohio
Contemporary hit radio stations in the United States
Marquee Broadcasting